Werner Schmid (25 November 1919 – 2005) was a Swiss modern pentathlete. He competed at the 1948 and 1952 Summer Olympics.

References

1919 births
2005 deaths
Swiss male modern pentathletes
Olympic modern pentathletes of Switzerland
Modern pentathletes at the 1948 Summer Olympics
Modern pentathletes at the 1952 Summer Olympics